The Cuartel del Conde-Duque (Spanish: Cuartel del Conde-Duque) is a building located in Madrid, Spain. It was declared Bien de Interés Cultural in 1976.

References 

Buildings and structures in Universidad neighborhood, Madrid
Bien de Interés Cultural landmarks in Madrid
Barracks in Spain